Mesorhaga is a genus of flies in the family Dolichopodidae.

Species

 Mesorhaga actites Bickel, 1994
 Mesorhaga adunca (Van Duzee, 1933)
 Mesorhaga africana Curran, 1927
 Mesorhaga albiciliata (Aldrich, 1893)
 Mesorhaga albiflabellata Parent, 1944
 Mesorhaga aurata Naglis, 2000
 Mesorhaga baadsvicki Bickel, 2007
 Mesorhaga borealis (Aldrich, 1893)
 Mesorhaga caerulea Van Duzee, 1930
 Mesorhaga canberrensis Bickel, 1994
 Mesorhaga caudata Van Duzee, 1915
 Mesorhaga chillagoensis Bickel, 1994
 Mesorhaga circumflexa Parent, 1937
 Mesorhaga clavicauda Van Duzee, 1925
 Mesorhaga cockatoo Bickel, 1994
 Mesorhaga cocori Bickel, 2007
 Mesorhaga coolumensis Bickel, 1994
 Mesorhaga danielsi Bickel, 1994
 Mesorhaga decembris Bickel, 1994
 Mesorhaga demeyeri Grichanov, 1998
 Mesorhaga didillibah Bickel, 1994
 Mesorhaga dimi Negrobov, 1984
 Mesorhaga dispar Becker, 1922
 Mesorhaga emmensis Bickel, 1994
 Mesorhaga falciunguis Bickel, 2007
 Mesorhaga flavicoma Bickel, 1994
 Mesorhaga flavipes Van Duzee, 1932
 Mesorhaga fujianensis Yang, 1995
 Mesorhaga funebris Parent, 1929
 Mesorhaga garamba Grichanov, 1999
 Mesorhaga gatesae Bickel, 1994
 Mesorhaga geoscopa Bickel, 1994
 Mesorhaga gingra Bickel, 1994
 Mesorhaga gracilis Zhu & Yang, 2011
 Mesorhaga grootaerti Yang, 1995
 Mesorhaga guangxiensis Yang, 1998
 Mesorhaga hule Bickel, 2007
 Mesorhaga isthmia Bickel, 2007
 Mesorhaga jucunda Becker, 1922
 Mesorhaga kirkspriggsi Grichanov, 2000
 Mesorhaga koongarra Bickel, 1994
 Mesorhaga lacrymans Parent, 1928
 Mesorhaga laeta Becker, 1922
 Mesorhaga lamondensis Bickel, 1994
 Mesorhaga lata Becker, 1922
 Mesorhaga limitata Becker, 1922
 Mesorhaga litoralis Grootaert & Meuffels, 1995
 Mesorhaga longipenis Bickel, 1994
 Mesorhaga longiseta Yang & Saigusa, 2001
 Mesorhaga maceveyi Bickel, 1994
 Mesorhaga mahunkai Grichanov, 1997
 Mesorhaga martius Bickel, 1994
 Mesorhaga mexicana Bickel, 2007
 Mesorhaga minatitlan Bickel, 2007
 Mesorhaga muchei Bickel, 1994
 Mesorhaga naumanni Bickel, 1994
 Mesorhaga nayaritensis Bickel, 2007
 Mesorhaga negrobovi Grichanov, 2021
 Mesorhaga nerrensis Bickel, 1994
 Mesorhaga nigripes (Aldrich, 1893)
 Mesorhaga nigrobarbata Parent, 1937
 Mesorhaga nigroviridis Becker, 1922
 Mesorhaga obscura Becker, 1922
 Mesorhaga ornatipes Van Duzee, 1932
 Mesorhaga ovalis Parent, 1932
 Mesorhaga palaearctica Negrobov, 1984
 Mesorhaga pallidicornis Van Duzee, 1925
 Mesorhaga pauliani Vanschuytbroeck, 1952
 Mesorhaga paupercula Parent, 1937
 Mesorhaga petrensis Bickel, 1994
 Mesorhaga prima Parent, 1932
 †Mesorhaga pseudolacrymans Bickel & Kraemer, 2016
 Mesorhaga queenslandensis Bickel, 1994
 Mesorhaga saetosa Naglis, 2000
 Mesorhaga sarukhani Bickel, 2007
 Mesorhaga schneiderae Bickel, 1994
 Mesorhaga septima Becker, 1922
 Mesorhaga setosa Zhu & Yang, 2011
 Mesorhaga similis Bickel, 1994
 Mesorhaga stylata Becker, 1922
 Mesorhaga stylatoides Grootaert & Meuffels, 1995
 Mesorhaga tanzaniensis Grichanov, 2021
 Mesorhaga tarooma Bickel, 1994
 Mesorhaga terminalis Becker, 1922
 Mesorhaga tindali Bickel, 1994
 Mesorhaga toddensis Bickel, 1994
 Mesorhaga townsendi (Aldrich, 1893)
 Mesorhaga tristis Schiner, 1868
 Mesorhaga tsurikovi Grichanov, 1998
 Mesorhaga turneri Bickel, 1994
 Mesorhaga varicornis Bickel, 1994
 Mesorhaga varipes Van Duzee, 1917
 Mesorhaga villanuevi Bickel, 2007
 Mesorhaga wanbi Bickel, 1994
 Mesorhaga weiri Bickel, 1994
 Mesorhaga wirthi Bickel, 1994
 Mesorhaga xizangensis Yang, 1995
 Mesorhaga yarratt Bickel, 1994
 Mesorhaga zborowskii Bickel, 1994

Unrecognised species:
 Mesorhaga torquata Bigot, 1890

References

Nearctic

Dolichopodidae genera
Sciapodinae
Taxa named by Ignaz Rudolph Schiner
Diptera of Asia
Diptera of Africa
Diptera of Australasia
Diptera of North America
Diptera of South America